Nathan James Outteridge  (born 28 January 1986) is an Australian sailor, a resident of Lake Macquarie.

Career highlights

Olympics 
2008 – Beijing Olympics 5th, 49er (with Ben Austin)
2012 – London Olympics  1st, 49er (with Iain Jensen )
2016 – Rio Olympics  2nd, 49er (with Iain Jensen )

He is most famous for winning a gold medal at the London Olympics in the 49er class, along with Iain Jensen. At the Rio Olympics he won silver, again with Jensen in the 49er. He campaigned for the 2020 Olympics and qualified his country for the Nacra 17 class sailing with his sister Haylee gaining a 2nd place at the World Championships.

World Championships

Together with teammate Ben Austin Outteridge became the 2008 World Champion in the 49er boat by finishing in front of Britons Stevie Morrison and Ben Rhodes. In 2007 they won the bronze medal in the same event at the World Championships in Cascais, Portugal. He is an Australian Institute of Sport scholarship holder.

America's Cup
In September 2012, he joined Artemis Racing for the final ACWS event in San Francisco and has since joined for the America's Cup in 2013. Nathan is one of the helmsmen for Artemis Racing the Challenger of Record for the 2013 America's Cup. He also skippered Artemis in the Louis Vuitton challenger series for the 2017 America's Cup, losing to Emirates Team New Zealand's.

Other events
2005 – Sydney, Sydney International Regatta,  1st, 49er
2007 – Medemblik, Breitling Regatta,  2nd, 49er
2007 – Sydney, Sydney International Regatta,  1st, 49er (with Ben Austin)
2010 – Silvaplana, International Moth Class Euro Championship,  1st, Moth
2012 – Wangi Wangi, New South Wales,  2nd, International A-Class Catamaran
2019 – SailGP Runner up skippering Team Japan, F50

In 2019 Outteridge skippered the Japanese team in the inaugural SailGP sailing in F50 foiling catamarans.

References

External links 
 
 
 
 
 49er World Championships
 OUTTERIDGE And AUSTIN Win 49er World Title
 Australians Outteridge & Jensen secure 49er sailing gold

1986 births
Living people
Australian Institute of Sport sailors
Australian male sailors (sport)
Sailors at the 2008 Summer Olympics – 49er
Sailors at the 2012 Summer Olympics – 49er
Sailors at the 2016 Summer Olympics – 49er
Olympic sailors of Australia
Team Korea sailors
Olympic gold medalists for Australia
Olympic silver medalists for Australia
Olympic medalists in sailing
Medalists at the 2012 Summer Olympics
Medalists at the 2016 Summer Olympics
420 class world champions
29er class sailors
49er class world champions
Moth class world champions
World champions in sailing for Australia
Artemis Racing sailors
2017 America's Cup sailors
2013 America's Cup sailors
Recipients of the Medal of the Order of Australia
21st-century Australian people